Duncan Mills May refer to:

 Duncans Mills, California
 Duncan Mills, Illinois